Nikoloz Aptsiauri (born 24 September 1992 in Georgia) is a Georgian rugby union player who plays for  in the 2022 Currie Cup First Division. His playing position is flanker. He was named in the  squad for the 2022 Currie Cup First Division. He has also represented Georgia international in both the 15-man code and in rugby sevens.

Reference list

External links
itsrugby.co.uk profile

1992 births
Living people
Rugby union flankers
The Black Lion players
Rugby union players from Georgia (country)
Georgia international rugby union players